The stained glass windows of Chartres Cathedral are held to be one of the best-preserved and most complete set of medieval stained glass, notably celebrated for their colours, especially their cobalt blue. They cover 2600 square metres in total and consist of 172 bays illustrating biblical scenes, the lives of the saints and scenes from the life of trade guilds of the period.

Some windows survive from an earlier Chartres Cathedral, such as the three lancets on the west front (1145–1155, contemporary with those made for Abbot Suger at the Basilica of Saint-Denis) and the lancet south of the choir known as 'Notre-Dame de la Belle Verrière', famed for its Chartres blue (1180). However, most of the windows were probably made between 1205 and 1240 for the present church, taking in the Fourth Crusade (bringing a large number of important relics to Chartres) and the Albigensian Crusade, as well as the reigns of Philip II Augustus (1180–1223) and Louis VIII (1223–1226), with the building's consecration finally occurring in 1260 under Louis IX (1226–1270).

Some of the windows were made later, such as those in the Vendôme Chapel (1400–1425) and some in the transepts (20th century), whilst some damaged 13th-century windows were restored from the 15th century onwards. The destruction of Reims Cathedral and its stained glass in 1914 caused shock across France and led to all Chartres' windows being taken out and stored throughout both world wars. Conservation and removal of pollution has been ongoing since 1972.

Why windows? 

Since the late 10th century all churches across Europe had been built in a common Romanesque style, with thick walls supported by massive external buttresses and often with barrel vaulted naves. This limited the number of windows, leading to a play of light and shade which builders compensated for by adding internal frescoes in bright colours. In northern France buildings in this style would still be quite dark, with semi-circular arches not allowing large windows. The lateral forces on the walls were very important and higher vaults inevitably meant a thicker wall to support and reinforce them. By contrast, lancet windows and ogive crossings allowed the forces to be spread across multiple points, meaning the walls no longer had to support the structures' whole weight and could have far more openings for windows. Thus far more light was allowed into the structure for the glass-painters and their colours to work with, though nothing could now be seen of the exterior from the interior.

This architectural advance ran in parallel with theological developments in the 12th century, dominated by the clergy. Genesis 1.1-5 evoked darkness and light, as elaborated by Abbot Suger alongside his reasons for rebuilding the choir of the church at Saint-Denis Abbey. When his contemporaries assisting in the choir's consecration in 1144, they were astonished by the amount of light entering the building. In his "On the Construction of the Church of St Denis", Suger justified the bright side chapels "thanks to which the whole church shines with wondrous light, uninterrupted by sparkling windows which radiate their beauty into the interior". This new art (known at the time as Opus Francigenum and only named Gothic architecture in the 17th century) spread from the Kingdom of France right across Europe. To quote Louis Grodecki, it was in the Abbey Church of St Denis "that Gothic architecture first emerges as a consistent way of building, fruitful in its solutions of independent ogives, arcus singulariter voluti as the abbot called them. The works at St Denis also included the first-ever rose window in its west façade.

In around 827 Louis the Pious had given St Denis Abbey a Greek manuscript of the works of Pseudo-Dionysius the Areopagite, which he had himself received from Michael II, Emperor of Byzantium. This manuscript and John Scotus Eriugena's interpretation of it was the origin for the whole mystical Free Spirit current in medieval theology, which strongly influenced Suger, an exact contemporary of Hugues de Saint-Victor, the most notable master in Paris at the time. He was comforted by his vision of the world, written in 1125 in his commentaries on Pseudo-Denis' Celestial Hierarchies. Georges Duby wrote "Hugues de Saint-Denis proclaimed that each sensed image is a sign or "sacrament" of invisible things, those things which the soul will discover when it is freed from its bodily envelope". He laid out three stages in this progression from the visible to the invisible:
 Cogito : exploring the perceivable world by studying abstract thought
 Meditatio : the soul looking upon itself introspectively
 Contemplatio : intuition of truth

The first affirmation Suger made is work was "God is light", quoting from the First Epistle of John 1,5 ("The news that we have learned from him and are announcing to you is that God is light and that in him there is nothing of darkness"). He backed up this identification of God with light with other texts from the Old and New Testaments and argued that such a truth had to be made manifest in a cathedral, since in such a church a bishop taught his Christian flock, a foretaste of the heavenly Jerusalem described in Revelations 21, 11-14 ("Its lustre was like that of a most precious stone, of jaspar stone transparent like crystal"). Entering by the cathedral's west door and moving towards the choir and high altar to receive communion, the faithful had to be able to go through the different stages described by Hugues de Saint-Victor.

Using the language of colour and changing harmonies according to the time of day, the stained glass windows formed a doxological liturgy, a canticle whose words were the images, a metaphor first used by Pope Honorius III in his 1219 letter to Stephen Langton - "That the happy church at Canterbury may thus sing a new song to the Lord". Stained glass windows were also linked with theological questions about baptism and the eucharist, two sacraments violently affected by heresies but firmly doctrinally defended by Eudes de Sully and the Fourth Lateran Council. Augustine of Hippo's City of God had already written that heretics would escape eternal damnation if they had received baptism and communion. Sacraments were often at the centre of stained glass windows, such as the windows on the lives of St Martin, St Paul and St Sylvester at Chartres, the third of these showing that saint's baptism of Constantine the Great. The Chartres windows on the lives of the Apostles also showed them baptising new disciples. However, such windows could only obliquely refer to the fierce debates about the problem of real presence and the moment of transubstantiation - the central medallions of the Chartres windows on the life of St Lubin (bay 45) show the stages in the wine's transformation into the blood of Christ. Other windows referred to other rites under debate in the late 12th century - confession, the hierarchy of church power, marriage, extreme unction, finding relics and translating relics.

Some windows referred to political theology such as the status of princes and kings and the balance of temporal and spiritual power. At a time when the kings of France were defending their hereditary right to rule, Chartres' windows of the Tree of Jesse showed the continuous line from the Kings of Judah to Christ via the Virgin Mary, whilst the windows on the life of Thomas Becket showed the recent clash in England between temporal and spiritual power. The windows on the life of St Sylvester were placed symmetrically with those on the life of Charlemagne - the former show Constantine as a bloodthirsty tyrant who later summoned St Sylvester to hear his repentance and heal him of leprosy, hearing his preaching and submitting to him after baptism, whilst those of Charlemagne show a royal figure that the Church could support (indeed, one that had been canonised on 29 December 1165 by Antipope Paschal III, though that canonisation was not recognised by the mainstream Church). These windows were probably chosen by Reginald of Bar, Bishop of Chartres and cousin of Philip II Augustus, who portrayed himself as the new Charlemagne, taking up the theme Suger had chosen for Saint-Denis to flatter Louis VI of France.

Schemes 

Understanding and interpreting the windows can be difficult in an era out of contact with medieval theology, teachings and sermons commenting on the Gothic cathedrals' stained glass windows. However, the presence of the famous 12th-century School of Chartres suggests that the precise placing of the windows had meaning for their designers. As taken up in the design of other Gothic churches, Suger's arguments showed how all four senses of scripture were present:

 Literal (the product of linguistic understanding of the statement)
 Allegorical or typological (stating one thing by saying another)
 Tropological or Moral (stages that the human spirit had to go through in order to ascend towards God; concerning the present)
 Anagogic (giving an idea of final realities which would become visible at the end of time; concerning the future)

The windows can be grouped in several different ways. One is between the lower levels with their narrative windows on the lives of Jesus, the Virgin Mary, the saints and the prophets, and the upper level with saints, major figures and prophets, showing the glory of the Christian Church. The narrative windows generally read from bottom to top and left to right, making connections between scenes, though the window of the Typological Passion (bay 37) is read from top to bottom. The scenes in a single window can be grouped together in squares, four-leaf flowers or lobes.

Another is reading from east (site of sunrise and reminiscent of Genesis 1) to west (site of sunset, reminiscent of Christ's death and resurrection as well as the Last Judgement) and north (with its scenes from the Bible and Christ's life) to south (announcing redemption and the Kingdom of God after Christ's second coming), two readings which can be combined across the cruciform plan of the cathedral. A rose window of the Last Judgement is placed above the main west door, whilst the north one centred on the Madonna and Child recalls the Incarnation leading to Redemption and the south one of Christ Triumphant surrounded by the 24 Elders of the Apocalypse announces Christ's second coming and the Kingdom of God.

Another interpretation divides the windows by their location in the nave, transepts and choir, with each of the three linked to a period in the history of revelation. This is more difficult to do at Chartres than in other churches. However, at this period Chartres Cathedral had hundreds of relics, not only the Virgin Mary's veil but also relics of Saints, Peter, Thomas, Catherine, Margaret and others - as it was impossible to show them all to the public the windows became a reminder of the diocese's relic collection for the faithful and pilgrims.

Technique and workshops 
Window glass had been made in France since the 5th century, with the oldest surviving figured glass from the country being the Wissembourg Christ. Recent restoration of the windows at Chartres has questioned Louis Grodecki's assertions that they were produced by two main workshops, one making the Good Samaritan window and the other making the Life of St Lubin window.

Stylistic analysis has revealed up to five different glass-painters who worked on the Good Samaritan window, including secondary glass-painters and a principal glass-painter, though it has also shown that a secondary glass-painter on one window might be a master glass-painter on another. This emphasis on individuals not workshops can be seen more clearly in 14th century stained glass and was probably to increase the speed of production.

Analysis of the glasses has shown they were originally the same colour and corroded identically, meaning that all the glass-painters used the same glass. The one exception is the Life of Saint Eustace window, whose glass has a different colour and has corroded differently, giving credence to Grodecki's conclusion that it was produced by an outside artist commissioned by the cathedral and bringing his own stock of glass with him.

The monk Theophilus Presbyter described glass-production in minute detail early in the 12th century in his treatise Schedula diversum artium - the glass-painter was to trace the composition of a window on a panel of bleached wood, before cutting the glass sections on it and finally painting and assembling them.

Bay numbering 

The bays' numbers were set in the Corpus vitrearum, running from 0 to 99 on the lower level, starting at the chevet and going as far as the nave facade. 0 is the bay on the axis of the apse or the axis of the chapel. The odd numbers are bays on the north side and the even numbers the bays on the south side. The upper level windows run from 100 to 199 on the same principals - bay 100 is the bay on the axis of the choir.

The best view of the lower windows' details is from the aisle and ambulatory. Starting at the centre of the nave in front of the west rose window, the windows are described in an anti-clockwise circuit, running through the south side of the nave, the south transept, the ambulatory, the north transept and finally the north side of the nave.

The upper windows are best seen from the opposite side of the aisle to the window viewed, but as they are taller than the lower windows they are harder to view. The circuit is clockwise, from the north side of the nave, the south transept, the choir, the apse, the north transept and finally the south side of the nave. Those in the nave and transepts are made up of two lancets and an eight-lobe rose window, whilst those in the choir are made up of two facing lancets below a rose and those in the apse are made up of single lancets. One has to cross the choir to see the windows behind the high altar.

Rose windows

West 
This consists of three lancets (bays 49–51) below a large rose-window (141), the latter formed of a 12-lobe eye and 12 sections each made up of 2 medallions, along with twelve smaller circles separated by quatrefoils. Together they form a large Christological canvas devoted to the Incarnation of the Logos as Jesus Christ, running from his Old Testament human roots (the Tree of Jesse), through his incarnation (nativity) and sacrifice (Passion), ending with redemption for those who have faith in him (the Last Judgement in the main west rose window).

The three lancets date to the mid 12th century, making them the oldest stained-glass in the cathedral. This section of the cathedral was built after a fire in 1135 and is the only part to survive the 1195 fire. The central lancet shows Christ's nativity and life and is flanked by two slightly smaller lancets of his Passion and his human and Davidic roots with a Tree of Jesse, the earliest surviving representation of this motif in stained glass, dating to 1145. It post-dates Suger's Stirps Jessein the stained glass of the chevet of Saint-Denis, named after the first words of the responsorial hymn by Fulbert of Chartres for the Feast of the Virgin Mary., but the latter has been heavily restored.

The rose window was made sixty years later, in 1215, after the 1195 fire, with the new cathedral's nave higher. Its centre shows Christ the Judge showing his windows, angels and the four beasts from the Book of Revelation. Above are Abraham and the Elect, whilst below are souls being weighed and the twelve apostles.

South (bay 122) 
Offered by the Dreux Bretagne family, which included Pierre Mauclerc, it was made between 1221 and 1230. It is made up of five lancets below a large rose window formed of a twelve-lobe eye, then twelve sections made up of medallions, then twelve circles, then twelve quatrefoils and finally twelve semi-circles bearing medallions

Lancets 
The central lancet shows the Madonna holding the Christ Child in her arms, flanked symmetrically by the four evangelists (left to right Luke, Matthew, John and Mark) sitting on the shoulders of the major Old Testament prophets (left to right Jeremiah, Isaiah, Ezekiel and Daniel), recalling a famous image by Bernard of Chartres, master and chancellor of the School of Chartres, handed down by John of Salisbury in colophon 400 of his Metalogicon - "Bernard of Chartres said that we are like dwarves perched on the shoulders of giants, and we can see better and further than them not because our sight is more piercing or our size is larger, but because we are raised into the air and carried up into the air thanks to their gigantic height".

Below the Virgin Mary are figures of Pierre of Dreux or Pierre Mauclerc and Alix of Thouars, along with the coats of arms of the counts of Dreux on the left (to the left below Jeremiah) and representations their daughter Yolande of Brittany (below Ezekiel) and their eldest son Jean le Roux (born in 1217).

Rose window 
This illustrates the first vision in the Book of Revelation (4, 1-11) of a figure with a face of jaspar and sardonyx sitting on throne in heaven, surrounded by a rainbow like emerald, twenty-four elders in white robes and golden crowns and four living creatures, with seven lamps before the throne. At the window's centre is Christ in Majesty, whilst running clockwise from bottom left the first circle shows the four living creatures of a lion, a bull, a man and an eagle, also seen as symbols of the Four Evangelists. The other windows show censing angels. The next two circles show the twenty-four elders, with quatrefoils with the Dreux family coat of arms between these two circles.

North (Bay 121) 
It is also known as the "House of France Window", since it was funded by Louis IX of France and his mother Blanche of Castile in 1230. It is made up of five lancets below a large rose window, whose lower corners are framed on each side by four small lancets. The rose is made up of a twelve-lobe central eye, then twelve medallion sections, then twelve square, then twelve quatrefoils and finally twelve semi-circular medallions.

Lancets
The leftmost lancet shows the king-priest Melchizedek above Nebuchadnezzar, the latter adoring an idol. The next lancet shows King David holding a harp above Saul throwing himself on his own sword, the latter symbolising the sin of anger, whilst the following lancet shows the Virgin Mary in the arms of Saint Anne, with the French royal coat of arms below. The fourth lancet shows King Solomon above Jeroboam, the latter adoring a golden calf, whilst the final lancet shows the high priest Aaron above Pharaoh and his army drowning in the Red Sea.

Rose 
At the centre is a Madonna and Child, surrounded by concentric circles. The inner one shows four doves (symbolising the gifts of the Holy Spirit), censing angels, candle-bearing angels and cherubim. The second circle is made of lozenges showing the lineage of the Kings of Judah from the Gospel of Matthew. The third and final circle shows the twelve minor prophets of the Old Testament. Between the second and third circles are quatrefoils with the coat of arms of the kingdom of France.

Lower windows 
There are 52 lower windows (0 to 51). At the north and south ends of the ambulatory, six of them are made up of two lancets each under a rose window, bringing the total number of windows up to 64.

Story windows 
Unlike the upper windows showing large full-length images of major figures, the lower windows are meant to be seen close-up. Made up of successive panels, generally reading bottom to top and left to right, they show narratives from the Bible, the apocrypha and lives of the saints, many also appearing in the Golden Legend, written fifty years after the windows were made. They are sometimes known as "legendaries" ("légendaires" in French), meaning "things which must be read". They formed a true visual catechism and preachers would instruct pilgrims to look at these illustrations.

South of the nave 

 48 - Life of St John the Evangelist
Draws on the 2nd century traditional legends on the saint's miracles and death, later compiled into Jacobus de Voragine's Golden Legend.
Armourers guild, 1205–1215.

 46 - Life of St Mary Magdalene
Combines tales of Mary Magdalene's preaching, the evangelisation of Provence and the legend of her death.
Water-carriers guild, 1205–1215.

 44 - Parable of the Good Samaritan
Placed in parallel with the Fall from the Book of Genesis.
Shoemakers guild, 1205–1215.

 42 - Death and Assumption of the Virgin
Shows the apostles at the Death, the miracles associated with his burial and her Assumption.
Shoemakers guild, 1205–1215.

 40 - Vendôme Family 
In the 15th century Flamboyant Gothic style in contrast to the 13th-century Primitive Gothic of the rest of the nave, the bay shows (left to right) the donor, his sister, their father and the donor's brother, kneeling with their spouses. The tympanum is a Last Judgement scene.

Donor Louis, Count of Vendôme, 1417.

 38 - Miracles of Our Lady
Shows pilgrimage to Chartres, the cathedral's construction and some of the miracles of Our Lady of Chartres. The lower circle underlines the appeal to the pilgrims' generosity to fund the project.
Butchers guild, 1205–1215.

South transept 
The south transept is made up of three bays, each consisting of a lancet. Two face west and one east due to the presence of the double ambulatory.

Funded by American architects, bay 32 dates to 1954, whilst bay 34 is made up of late 15th and early 16th century fragments and bay 36 is 12th–13th century but is not in its original position.

Ambulatory

South ambulatory (30-26) 
Chartres' windows are celebrated for their cobalt blue, known as "Chartres blue" or "Romanesque blue", which first emerged in the workshops at Saint-Denis Basilica in the 1140s and was also used at Le Mans Cathedral. With a sodium base coloured with cobalt, it is the more resistant than reds and greens of the same era.

"Notre-Dame de la Belle-Verrière", one of 75 representations of the Virgin Mary in Chartres Cathedral, owes its fame to this exceptional cobalt blue. It was almost lost in the 1194 fire, with only its central panel of the Madonna and Child and the three windows over the main door surviving.

All Saints Chapel (24-20)

Confessors' Chapel (18-10)

Entrance to the Saint Piatus Chapel (8-6)

Chapel of the Apostles (4-3) 

The chapel at the east end of most cathedrals is dedicated to the Virgin Mary and thus known as a Lady Chapel, but Chartres Cathedral is itself dedicated to the Virgin Mary and so its east-end chapel is dedicated to the apostles and their evangelisation. It was in this chapel that Pope Innocent III launched the Albigensian Crusade in 1208, mentioning the mission of the apostles and underlining that bishops were their successors.

Side Chapel (5-7)

Martyrs' Chapel (9-17)

Side-chapel (19-23)

North Ambulatory (25-29)

North transept 
In the north part of the transepts bay 31 dates from 1971 and bay 33 includes fragments of 12th- and 13th-century panels remounted with modern elements in 1964.

North of the nave 
Unlike the other windows, those on the Passion and Redemption (bay 37) read top to bottom.

"Lives" windows

Upper windows 
There are 44 upper windows (0 to 43). Except the seven windows of the apse (each consisting of a single lancet) and those in bay 132 (whose lancets were walled-in in the 16th century to install the main organ), all the base of the upper level are made up of 2 lancets below a rose, which brings the number of windows to 68. The small rose windows to the south and north are each counted as a single window due to their specific composition.

Nave - south side 
All these windows were restored by Coffetier between 1873 and 1883. Bay 132 was walled in to install the main organ.

North Transept

Choir and apse

South Side of the Choir 
The lancets (but not the rose windows) of bays 108 and 112 were destroyed in the 18th century. Before their destruction, Bay 108 showed scenes from the lives of Saint Bartholomew and the Virgin Mary, whilst Bay 112 showed scenes from those of Saint Eustace and Saint George.

Apse

North choir

South transept

Nave - north side

Donors
It took several donations to build the new cathedral. Its construction involved all parts of medieval society – sovereigns (whose arms are seen in the north transept facade windows), nobles from the Chartres, Île-de-France and Normandy regions, the cathedral chapter and the trade guilds. The nobles are shown in 26 upper windows but only three lower ones and so were mainly involved in funding the former - those depicted include Louis VIII, Étienne de Sancerre, Guillaume de la Ferté, Simon de Montfort, Thibault VI, count of Blois and Chartres, Ferdinand III of Castille, Raoul de Courtenay, Robert de Champignelles, a lord of the Bar-Loupy family, Bouchard de Montmorency, Robert de Beaumont, Jean de Courville, Pierre de Dreux (known as Mauclerc), Jean Clément de Metz, lord of Mez and Argentan and Philippe Hurepel, count of Boulogne. Blanche of Castile and Louis IX funded the north façade of the transepts, whilst those on the south façade of the transepts were paid for by Pierre de Dreux. Nearly thirty confraternities and corporations also funded windows and are also shown, including those for carpenters, labourers, wine growers, masons, stone cutters, drapers, furriers and bakers.

Guild windows 

Windows funded by trade guilds first appeared at Chartres and Bourges Cathedral between 1205 and 1215. Chartres' 172 windows include 125 representations of artisans engaged in 25 different jobs - making, transporting or selling their products in 42 windows.

Notes and references

Notes

References

Further reading

Bibliography (in French, by publication date) 
 Lassus, Jean-Baptiste-Antoine; Pineu-Duval, Eugène-Emmanuel-Amaury; Didron, Adolphe-Napoléon (1867). Monographie de la cathédrale de Chartres, publiée par les soins du ministre de l'Instruction publique (Gr. in-fol., 2 p., 72 pl.) (in French). Paris: Impr. nationale. 
 Houvet, Étienne; Delaporte, Yves (1926). Les Vitraux de la Cathédrale de Chartres. 
 

 
 

 
 
 .

See also 
 The Good Samaritan Window, Cathedral of Our Lady of Chartres
 Saint Thomas Becket window in Chartres Cathedral
 French Gothic stained glass windows

External links 
 
 
 
 
 
 

Chartres Cathedral
Chartres
Medieval art